Dairyville is an extinct town in Reynolds County, in the U.S. state of Missouri.

The community was named for dairy farms in the area.

References

Ghost towns in Missouri
Former populated places in Reynolds County, Missouri